Petar Vitanov (born 10 March 1995) is a Bulgarian professional footballer who currently plays as a midfielder for Lokomotiv Plovdiv.

Vitanov began his career with CSKA Sofia. After progressing into the first team, he made his senior debut in December 2013. However, he struggled to establish himself in the first team, making 32 appearances during a four-year spell. He was released by CSKA in 2017 and joined Vereya. In January 2018, Vitanov signed with Cherno More Varna, before moving to Lokomotiv Plovdiv in June 2019.

Club career
Vitanov started his career at home-town club CSKA Sofia, joining their youth system as a seven-year-old. In 2009, after a successful trial he won a scholarship and joined the Football Academy of Brooke House College in England.

In 2012 Vitanov returned to CSKA. On 19 July 2013, he signed his first professional contract with the club, keeping his services at CSKA until 2016. He made his debut on 14 December 2013, coming on as a 46th-minute substitute for Emil Gargorov in a 7–0 home win over Lyubimets 2007.

In June 2017, Vitanov signed with Vereya.

On 12 January 2018, Vitanov signed with Cherno More.  On 17 February, he made his official debut for the club in a 1–4 home defeat by Beroe.

International career
He made his debut for Bulgaria national football team on 28 March 2021 in a World Cup qualifier against Italy.

Statistics
As of 20 March 2021

Honours

Club
CSKA Sofia
 Bulgarian Cup: 2015–16

Lokomotiv Plovdiv
 Bulgarian Cup: 2019–20
 Bulgarian Supercup: 2020

References

External links

1995 births
Living people
Footballers from Sofia
Bulgarian footballers
Bulgaria youth international footballers
First Professional Football League (Bulgaria) players
Second Professional Football League (Bulgaria) players
PFC CSKA Sofia players
FC Vereya players
PFC Cherno More Varna players
PFC Lokomotiv Plovdiv players
Association football midfielders
Bulgaria international footballers